Jan Joakim Strand (born 2 August 1982 in Turku) is a Finnish politician currently serving in the Parliament of Finland for the Swedish People's Party of Finland representing the Vaasa constituency.

References

1982 births
Living people
People from Turku
Swedish-speaking Finns
Swedish People's Party of Finland politicians
Members of the Parliament of Finland (2011–15)
Members of the Parliament of Finland (2019–23)